Sinocyclocheilus oxycephalus is a species of ray-finned fish in the genus Sinocyclocheilus.

References 

oxycephalus
Fish described in 1985